The Abbey Pax Mariae, more commonly referred to as Vadstena Abbey, situated on Lake Vättern in the Diocese of Linköping, Sweden, was the motherhouse of the Bridgettine Order. The abbey started on one of the farms donated to it by the king, but the town of Vadstena grew up around it. It was active from 1346 until 1595.

History

Foundation and duration
The abbey was founded in 1346 by Saint Bridget with the assistance of King Magnus IV of Sweden and his Queen Blanche, who made a will donating ten farms, including that of Vadstena in Dal Hundred, Östergötland, to the abbey founded by Bridget.

The daughter of Saint Bridget, Saint Catherine, on arriving there in 1374 with the relics of her mother, found only a few novices under a Religious Superior. They chose Catherine as their abbess. She died in 1381, and it was not until 1384 that the abbey was blessed by the Bishop of Linköping. The first recognized abbess was Ingegerd Knutsdotter, granddaughter of Saint Bridget. The canonization of Saint Bridget in 1391 and the translation of her remains to the Abbey Church in 1394 added greatly to the fame and riches of her community.

In 1400 Duke Eric of Pomerania was invested at Vadstena by his great-aunt, Queen Margaret, as King of Denmark, Norway and Sweden. The grave of his wife, Queen Philippa, and that of Catherine, Queen Consort of King Carl II of Sweden, are located here.

Bridgetine literature consisted mostly of translations into Swedish of portions of the Bible or of the legends of the saints. Such writings as are extant have been published for the most part by the Svenska fornskriftsällskapet (Old Swedish Texts Society) of Stockholm. The manuscripts are held in the Royal Library, Stockholm (including two in Swedish in Birgitta's handwriting), and at the University Libraries of Uppsala (which also has contemplative manuscripts in English connected with the English mission), and Lund.

Of these authors, the best known belonging to Vadstena are perhaps Margareta Clausdotter (abbess 1473, died 1486), author of a work on the family of St. Bridget (printed in "Scriptores Rerum Svecicarum", III, I, 207-16), and Nicolaus Ragvaldi, monk and General Confessor of the abbey (1476–1514), who composed several works.

The abbey was a double monastery, with both a male section of 25 monks and a female section of 60 nuns. The monks were organised under the General Confessor and the nuns under a prioress, while the abbey as a whole was organised under an abbess, who was elected by both the monks and the nuns.

The abbey was greatly favored by the royal house and nobility and became the spiritual center of the country as well as the greatest landowner in Sweden. The abbey was known to manage a hospital and retirement home, which is recorded from 1401. Early on, Vadstena Abbey supported Beghards and Beguines, the latter often aristocratic women, who had a poor reputation among Church authorities. In 1412, the abbey was ordered to expel them, but this was not done until 1506. In 1436, the bailiff Jösse Eriksson sought asylum in the abbey, but was forced out and arrested all the same. In 1419, the abbey was subjected to an investigation wherein the abbess, as well as the nuns, were accused of having accepted personal gifts and having entertained male guests at unacceptable hours.

Vadstena Abbey also had international fame as the motherhouse of all the monasteries of the Bridgettine Order, such as Reval, Nådendal, Bergen and Danzig. It kept in contact with other monasteries, performed inspections of them and sent both nuns and monks to them when they were lacking in members. In 1406, for example, an English delegation headed by Henry FitzHugh, 3rd Baron FitzHugh arrived asking for members in order to establish a Bridgettine monastery in England, and in 1415 four nuns, three female novices, one monk and one priest left the abbey under great celebrations for the foundation of what became the famed Syon Abbey.

Post-reformation and dissolution

After the introduction of the Reformation in Sweden in 1527, monastic communities in Sweden were effectively ended by the ban against accepting new novices and assets where declared crown property in accordance with the Reduction of Gustav I of Sweden.  The existing members were allowed to stay until their death, to be supported by an allowance from the former property of the monastery, or to leave if they wished. Vadstena Abbey, however, was exempted from this ban and allowed to accept novices even after the Reformation, though only by special permission from the monarch. This regulation was directed to Bishop Hans Brask by King Gustav Vasa in 1527 after an elopement by a novice the previous year.

The Abbey had a favorable position because of its international fame and because of its strong ties with the Swedish nobility, due to its foundress. Many of the monks and nuns were from the nobility, including the King's own sister, Anna. It also served as a burial ground for many noble families. The nuns and monks of Vadstena Abbey were, however, allowed to leave the abbey if they wished. Among the most notable who did leave was Abbess Birgitta Botolfsdotter, who left the abbey to marry. In 1544 the King, reportedly after having been asked by some of the monks and nuns, issued an instruction which specifically allowed the nuns and monks to leave the Vadstena Abbey to marry if they wished to, and specifically forbade the abbess and the other members of the abbey from stopping them. The younger nuns were reportedly more willing to leave than the older, but the nuns in general stayed more often than the monks. In large part, this may be due to the fact that the monks, after having converted to Lutheranism, were provided with the professions of medical doctor, pastor or teacher, while the nuns seldom had a choice other than marriage. As a result, far more of them remained in the abbey than did the monks.

In May 1540, the Abbey was visited by the local Protestant bishop. The Catholic Mass and the veneration of saints were banned and Protestant services were ordered to be held in the Abbey church. The nuns are reported to have plugged their ears during the sermon. An inventory of the abbey's valuables was made by the Crown, and in 1543, most of the books and valuables were confiscated. The abbey was allowed to receive private donations on condition that the monks refrain from the public Catholic sermons they had evidently been preaching until then.

Vadstena Abbey was granted large donations by private benefactors, both from the public and from the Royal Palace. Among the notable benefactors were Queen Margaret Leijonhufvud and her family, the former Abbess Birgitta Botolfsdotter and her wealthy husband, Queen Karin Månsdotter, Anna Hogenskild and Jöran Persson. In 1549, the majority of the monks were ordered to leave the abbey. In 1550, the nuns were moved to the smaller part of the abbey, the wing previously belonging to the monks, and in 1555 the male contingent of the abbey was formally abolished and Vadstena Abbey became an all-female community. During the Northern Seven Years' War of 1567, the abbey was looted by Danish soldiers. In 1568, the number of nuns was counted as 18.

During the reign of King John III (1569–1592), the abbey was restored and enriched, and the abbess was on very good terms with the royal couple. In 1575, John III granted the abbey the right to receive novices without restriction again, and his Catholic Queen, Catherine Jagellon, made donations to it and forged contacts between the abbey and Rome. The Jesuit Antonio Possevino, as Papal Legate, reformed it in 1580. At this occasion, the abbess and the prioress were made to swear the Tridentine Oath of 1564 and the nuns were made to take their vows a second time. Possevino also left with a group of boys to be educated as Catholic priests. In 1587, the first Catholic Solemn Mass since the Reformation was held in the abbey during a visit by the King and the Crown Prince, and in 1592, a seminary to prepare Catholic priests was founded. The Catholic King Sigismund granted the Vadstena Abbey his protection at his coronation in 1594. The Papal Legate Germanico Malaspina visited the abbey and a young girl was accepted as a novice.

Later in 1594, however, the Protestant Duke Charles, later Charles IX of Sweden, took power and ordered the dissolution of Vadstena Abbey. In 1595, the majority of the remaining 11 nuns left with their abbess and, after having spent the winter in Söderköping, sailed to the Bridgettine Abbey of Danzig, Marienbrunn Abbey, in the spring of 1596. Three remaining nuns were there for the visit of Bishop Abraham Angermannus in July 1596. Of these, one married an officer and courtier of Charles IX, another one became lady-in-waiting to  Queen Christina, and the last one, Karin Johansdotter, was allowed to stay in the building of the former abbey employed as a caretaker to the abbey's gardens until 1605.

When Magnus Vasa, Duke of Östergötland, died in 1595 he was buried in the abbey church. His sarcophagus can still be seen today.

Post-dissolution
After Karin Johansdotter left the former abbey in 1605, the buildings were left empty for almost 40 years. There were plans to found a university in them, but nothing came of this. In 1641, a Krigsmanshus (home for veterans) was founded for retired and invalid soldiers and their families, and was housed in the former nuns' wing for over 140 years. It also provided a school for the soldiers' children. The home was closed in 1783.

In 1795, a hospital for venereal diseases was established in both the male and female sections of the former abbey. From the 1840s, it also received patients with other illnesses and became a public hospital. The hospital was moved to modern facilities in 1909. The nuns' section of the abbey was used as a prison from 1810 to 1825, and after that as a part of the Vadstena Insane Asylum until 1951. The northern building, which contains the nuns' chapterhouse and dormitory, was going to be converted into other uses when in 1956 it was discovered to contain substantial remains of a thirteenth-century royal palace. A thorough restoration was undertaken and in 2003 it became a monastery museum, Vadstena klostermuseum.

In 1935, the religious sisters of the Birgittine Order came to Vadstena under the Saint Elisabeth Hasselblad and established a convent outside of the grounds of the former abbey. In 1963 the convent was refounded as a Bridgettine convent of the original branch of the Order (see further below).

The abbey church is still standing and contains a few memorials of St. Bridget. This devotional site, known as The Blue Church, is visited by both Lutheran and Roman Catholic pilgrims. The Blue Church contains relics of Saint Bridget in a red-coloured casket  as well as medieval sculptures of Saint Bridget, Saint Anne and the Blessed Virgin Mary and other medieval art.

Three other buildings also remain: the best preserved is the royal palace/nuns' chapterhouse/museum mentioned above; the other two have been converted into a hotel and restaurant.

Modern abbey
The present-day monastery of Bridgettine nuns, situated near the ancient abbey, is named Mary's Peace. It was established from a Bridgettine abbey in the Netherlands, one of the very few abbeys of the original branch of the Order that still remain, and currently numbers eight nuns. In 1991 it was raised to the status of an autonomous abbey.

Chronology
 1346 - King Magnus IV and Queen Blanche donate the royal estate Vadstena kungsgård to the foundation of a future monastery.
 1370 - Pope Urban V gives his approval to the plan of St Bridget.
 1373 - Bridget dies in Rome.
 1374 - The remains of Bridget are taken to Vadstena. Her daughter, Saint Catherine of Vadstena is elected Abbess of Vadstena.
 1384 - The Abbey is officially blessed.
 1391 - Bridget is declared a saint.
 1430 - Queen Philippa is buried here and the Church of Vadstena Abbey is blessed.
 1451 - Queen Catherine is buried here.
 1495 - A printing press is installed at the abbey.
 1527 - The Reformation bans the Abbey from accepting any new novices without special permission from the monarch. The nuns and monks are given permission to leave the community if they so wish.
 1540 - The Catholic Mass is banned and Protestant services are held in the abbey.
 1541 - The Abbey is allowed to receive private donations again, but most of its assets are confiscated.
 1544 - The monarch specifically bans the abbey from preventing members from leaving.
 1549 - The majority of the monks are evicted from the abbey.
 1550 - The Abbey church is closed to the members of the abbey, who are limited to use of the former monks' chapel. The nuns and the few remaining monks are limited to the use of only the small wing of the abbey formerly the monks' section.
 1555 - The male contingent of the Abbey is dissolved, and the monks leave Vadstena Abbey.
 1567 - Danish soldiers loot the abbey during the Northern Seven Years' War.
 1575 - King John III of Sweden allows the Abbey to accept novices without restriction again.
 1580 - The Abbey is visited and reformed by the Papal Legate Antonio Possevino.
 1587 - The first public Solemn Mass since the Reformation is celebrated in the presence of the King and Crown Prince.
 1592 - A seminary for the education of Catholic priests is founded.
 1595 - Duke Magnus is buried here and the monastic community of the Abbey is dissolved.
 1641 - A home for retired and invalid soldiers is founded in the former abbey. It is closed in 1783.
 1795 - A hospital for venereal diseases is founded in the former abbey. It is closed in 1909.
 1810 - A prison is founded in the former nuns' wing. It is closed in 1825.
 1826 - The former nuns' wing is transformed into a lunatic asylum. That is closed in 1951.
 1935 - Sisters of the Order of Saint Bridget open a rest home on the estate.
 1963 - The Monastery of Pax Mariæ of Saint Bridget is opened.
 1991 - The monastery is raised to the status of an autonomous abbey.

The abbesses of Vadstena 
 1374-1381 : Catherine of Vadstena (not officially installed)
 1381-1385 : Margareta Bosdotter (Oxenstierna) (not officially installed)
 1385-1403 : Ingegerd Knutsdotter (officially installed in 1388)
 1403-1422 : Gerdeka Hartlevsdotter
 1422-1447 : Bengta Gunnarsdotter
 1447-1452 : Ingeborg of Holstein (first time)
 1452-1456 : Katarina Bengtsdotter
 1457-1457 : Katarina Ulfsdotter
 1457-1465 : Ingeborg of Holstein (second time)
 1465-1473 : Katarina Petersdotter
 1473-1486 : Margareta Clausdotter
 1487-1496 : Anna Paulsdotter
 1496-1501 : Margareta Thuresdotter
 1501-1518 : Anna Bülow
 1518-1529 : Anna Germundsdotter
 1529-1534 : Katarina Eriksdotter
 1534-1539 : Birgitta Botolfsdotter
 1539-1548 : Katarina Mattsdotter (died 1559)
 1548-1553 : Margareta Nilsdotter
 1553-1564 : Katarina Bengtsdotter Gylta (first time)
 1564-1565 : Ingegerd Larsdotter
 1565-1593 : Katarina Benktsdotter Gylta (second time)
 1593-1595 : Katarina Olofsdotter

See also
Bjärka-Säby Monastery
Pirita Convent
Christina Brask, 15th c. nun

References

C[arl] S[ilfverstolp]e ([revised by] [K.] R. G[eete]), "Vadstena kloster", in Nordisk familjebok, vol. 31 (1921), col. 263 ff.
 Vadstena monastery and city
 Signum svenska kulturhistoria (Swedish ): Renässansen (2005)
 Register
 Carl Silfverstolpe (Swedish) : Vadstena klosters uppbörds- och utgiftsbok
 Wilhelmina Stålberg (Swedish) : Anteckningar om svenska qvinnor
 Lennart Jörälv (Swedish): Reliker och mirakel. Den heliga Birgitta och Vadstena (2003)
  (Swedish) Studier i Vadstena klosters och Birgittinordens historia intill midten af 1400-talet microform 
 Vadstena klosters minnesbok microform (Swedish): Diarium vazstenense 
 (Swedish) Historiskt bibliotek utgifvet af Carl Silfverstolpe

External links
Website of the Abbey of Mary's Peace, Vadstena
Website of the Vadstena Klostermuseum (Vadstena Monastery Museum)

Vadstena
1346 establishments in Europe
14th-century establishments in Sweden
1595 disestablishments in Europe
1963 establishments in Sweden
Gothic architecture in Sweden
Christian monasteries established in the 14th century
20th-century Christian monasteries
Buildings and structures in Östergötland County
Monasteries dissolved under the Swedish Reformation
Burial sites of the House of Vasa